Arduino is an Italian masculine name, with variants including Ardovino, Ardoino, Ardolino, Arduilio, Arduo and the feminine Arduina. It derives from the Germanic Hardwin (Ortwin), in medieval Italy found in the forms Ardovinus, Ardoinus and Arduinus. 
In English it is often rendered as Arduin.

People with the given name Arduino
 Arduino Berlam (1880–1946), Italian architect
 Arduino Cantafora (born 1945), Italian architect and painter
 Arduino della Padule, 11th-century military tutor of Matilda of Tuscany
 Arduino d’Ivrea (955–1015), also known as Arduin of Italy, Margrave of Ivrea and self-proclaimed King of Italy
 Arduino il Glabro, or Arduino Glabrione, (died 977), Margrave of Turin
 Arduino di Melfi, or Arduin the Lombard, an 11th-century Greek-speaking Lombard nobleman
 Arduin of Ivrea, King of Italy from 1002 until 1014

People with the surname Arduino
 Anna Maria Arduino (1663–1700), writer and painter, the Princess of Piombino from Messina, Sicily
 Giovanni Arduino (born 1970), Italian writer
 Giovanni Arduino (1714–1795), known as the “father of Italian Geology”; Dorsum Arduino, a wrinkle ridge on the Moon, is named after him
 Pietro Arduino (botanist) (1728–1805), brother of the geologist Giovanni Arduino

See also
Arduino (disambiguation)